Allan Faulkner La Fontaine (5 December 1910 – 14 August 1999) was an Australian rules footballer who played with and coached Melbourne in the Victorian Football League (VFL).

Private life
La Fontaine was born at the country town of Eskdale, Victoria. While still a youngster his parents, Cyrelle and Beatrice, brought the family to Melbourne where they settled in the suburb of Footscray. He had three brothers, Claude, Lionel and Donald. La Fontaine attended St Joseph's CBC North Melbourne (later St Joseph's College, Melbourne) from 1925–29 where he earned the title Captain of College three years in a row; 1927, 1928 and 1929.

At school he made his mark as both an excellent athlete, handball player and footballer. In 1930 he went on to complete his secondary education at St Kevin's College, Melbourne before proceeding to university where he was eventually granted Bachelor of Science in 1946.

La Fontaine enjoyed a variety of activities which included boxing, cricket and in 1936 working as a seaman on an oil tanker bound for America.

In July 1940, La Fontaine married Mary Williams at St Patrick's Cathedral.

During World War II, he served as a Flying Officer with the RAAF between 1942 and 1945, and he saw action in New Guinea and the nearby islands. Two of his brothers served in the Australian Army during the same conflict. On his return he took up his trade as an industrial chemist and analyst in a Melbourne business.

La Fontaine died in Sydney in August 1999 and is buried in Macquarie Park Cemetery.

Football career

Recruited to the Old Paradians by its founder Lou Arthur, La Fontaine vindicated the transport magnate's faith by booting an incredible 156 goals in the football club's inaugural season of 1929. His football career changed dramatically when he was later recruited from University Blacks. In his last year (1933) as an amateur he kicked a record 197 goals for the season.

He was considered a brilliant amateur full-forward, and was to earn his fame playing with the Melbourne Football Club as a centreman.  He was appointed captain of Melbourne in 1936. He led the club to their hat-trick of premierships in 1939, 1940 and 1941. La Fontaine went on to coach Melbourne from 1949 until 1951.

In 1996 La Fontaine was inducted into the Australian Football Hall of Fame.

References

Sources
 
 
 Second World War Nomonal Roll: Flying Officer Allan Faulkiner La Fontaine (119471).

External links

 Boyles Football Photos: Allan LaFontaine (sic).
 Demonwiki: Allan La Fontaine.

Melbourne Football Club players
Melbourne Football Club coaches
Australian Football Hall of Fame inductees
Keith 'Bluey' Truscott Trophy winners
Royal Australian Air Force personnel of World War II
1910 births
1999 deaths
Australian people of French descent
Melbourne Football Club captains
Australian rules footballers from Melbourne
University Blacks Football Club players
People educated at St Kevin's College, Melbourne
Royal Australian Air Force officers
Melbourne Football Club Premiership players
Three-time VFL/AFL Premiership players
People from Footscray, Victoria
Military personnel from Melbourne
University of Melbourne alumni
People educated at St Joseph's College, Melbourne